Triphosgene (bis(trichloromethyl) carbonate (BTC) is a chemical compound with the formula OC(OCCl3)2.  It is used as a solid substitute for phosgene, which is a gas. Triphosgene is stable up to 200 °C. Triphosgene is used in a variety of halogenation reactions.

Preparation
This compound is commercially available. It is prepared by exhaustive free radical chlorination of dimethyl carbonate:
CH3OCO2CH3 + 6 Cl2 → CCl3OCO2CCl3 + 6 HCl
Triphosgene can be easily recrystallized from hot hexanes.

Uses
Triphosgene is used as a reagent in organic synthesis as a source of CO2+.  It behaves like phosgene to which it cracks thermally:
OC(OCCl3)2 → 3 OCCl2
Alcohols are converted to carbonates.  Primary and secondary amines are converted to ureas and isocyanates.

Triphosgene has been used to synthesize organohalides. The use of triphosgene in these reactions provided a broader class of substrates that could be used for halogenation. Alkyl chlorides are synthesized via an SN2 reaction with chloride ions using triphosgene and pyridine. An alternative reaction uses triphosgene and sodium hydride, which results in a carbonyl addition and a ring opening caused by chloride ions. Alkyl dichlorides and trichlorides can similarly be synthesized using triphosgene. Vinyl chlorides are synthesized using triphosgene and DMF to form a Vilsmeier reagent from a ketone, followed by a ring opening by chloride ions. Aryl chlorides can also be produced using a Vilsmeier reagent from triphosgene and DMF. Chlorocarbonates can be synthesized by a ketone reacting with triphosgene, which forms a six-membered ring that is then chlorinated. In addition to chlorination reactions, triphosgene can be used in a mixture with potassium bromide to create aryl bromides.

Triphosgene is capable of converting several functional groups, which is useful in the formation of reaction intermediates. Triphosgene is used in the preparation of carbonyl chlorides, the activation of carboxylic acids, and the addition of carbonyl groups.

Safety
Triphosgene's low vapor pressure makes it possible for it to reach concentrations that are considered toxicologically unsafe. While several properties of triphosgene are not yet readily available, it is known that it is very toxic if inhaled. A toxic gas is emitted if it comes in contact with water. There is a lack of information and variability regarding the proper handling of triphosgene. It is assumed to have the same risks as phosgene.

See also 
 Phosgene
 Diphosgene

References

External links 
Bulletin about Triphosgene
Material Safety Data Sheet

Organochlorides
Carbonate esters
Reagents for organic chemistry
Trichloromethyl esters
Carbon oxohalides